Kim Da-bin (born 2 January 1997) is a South Korean tennis player.

She reached best WTA rankings of world No. 318 in singles and No. 365 in doubles, and has won four singles and six doubles titles on tournaments of the ITF Women's Circuit.

Kim made her WTA Tour main-draw debut at the 2016 Korea Open, where she received entry into the doubles tournament by a wildcard partnering Han Sung-hee.

ITF Circuit finals

Singles: 9 (4 titles, 5 runner–ups)

Doubles: 17 (6 titles, 11 runner–ups)

References

External links
 
 

1997 births
Living people
South Korean female tennis players
Sportspeople from Busan
Tennis players at the 2014 Summer Youth Olympics
21st-century South Korean women